"Mystery Train" is a 1953 song by Junior Parker, first covered by Elvis Presley, then numerous others. 

Mystery Train may also refer to:

Music
 Mystery Train (book), a 1975 book about rock 'n' roll, by Greil Marcus
 Mystery Train, blues musician Willie D. Warren's backing band
 "Mystery Train", a song by Bon Jovi song from Crush

Film, television and radio 
 The Mystery Train (film), a 1931 American film  by Phil Whitman
 Mystery Train (film), a 1989 American film by Jim Jarmusch
 "Mystery Train" (Adventure Time), an episode of the TV series Adventure Time
 Mystery Train, an American radio program on WJZF-LP, Standish, Maine
 Mystery Train, an Irish radio program on RTÉ, presented by John Kelly

Other uses 
 Mystery Train (Nancy Drew/Hardy Boys), a Nancy Drew and Hardy Boys mystery novel
 Mystery Train, an expansion for the board game Ticket to Ride